Cottam Parkway is a proposed railway station to the west of Preston, England. The proposed station would serve existing and new developments in the Lea civil parish. 

As part of the original Preston Local Plan, the station would have been constructed in 2022/23 adjacent to the Preston Western Distributor Road, which will link to the M55 motorway. In the amended plan the Cottam station looked set to be removed because of uncertainty over its location. Preston was shortlisted for the Transforming City Fund, including a proposal to fund Cottam railway station. It is now planned to submit a planning application in 2022, which, if successful, could lead to an opening in 2024 or 2025.

The plan is to locate it on the Preston to Blackpool section.   Construction may have required the closure of the neighbouring Salwick railway station, as referred to in Page 38 of the Central Lancashire Highways and Transport Masterplan.

In December 2020 Lancashire County Council agreed to acquire land to assist with the construction of the station and access roads. LCC submitted a planning application in October 2022.

Location 

The station would be near the site of the former Lea Road railway station between Lea Road and Sidgreaves Lane. It was planned to be part of the construction of a new distributor road linking the M55 with the A583, which began in September 2019 and is scheduled for completion in early 2023.

References

Proposed railway stations in England
Railway stations in the City of Preston